Ulotrichopus pseudocatocala is a moth of the  family Erebidae. It is found in the Democratic Republic of Congo and South Africa, Angola, Cameroon, Equatorial Guinea, Ivory Coast, Rwanda and Uganda.

References

Moths described in 1918
Ulotrichopus
Moths of Africa